Marco Antonio Granados Villegas (born 29 September 1996) is a Mexican professional footballer who plays as a striker.

Career

Youth career
Granados spent his whole youth career at C.D. Guadalajara's youth academy. He participated any various international youth tournaments with the club, and scored a total of 52 goals during three tournaments in Sweden, Denmark, and Norway.

Loan at Venados
In July 2015, it was announced Granados was sent out on loan to Ascenso MX club Venados in order to gain professional playing experience. He made his professional debut on 24 July 2015 against Zacatecas.

Guadalajara
Granados made his official Liga MX debut under coach Matias Almeyda as a substitute on 14 February 2016 against Club León.

Loan at Coras
On 6 June 2016, Guadalajara announced Granados was sent out on loan to Coras in order to gain playing time.

Loan at Tampico Madero
In December 2016, Guadalajara announced Granados was sent out on loan to Tampico Madero.

International career
Granados won the CONCACAF U-17 Championship with Mexico in 2013. He was a part of the national team that made the final at the 2013 FIFA U-17 World Cup in the United Arab Emirates.

Honours
Mexico U17
CONCACAF U-17 Championship: 2013
FIFA U-17 World Cup Runner-Up: 2013

Individual
CONCACAF U-17 Championship Golden Boot: 2013

References

External links
 
 

1996 births
Living people
Footballers from Colima
Mexican footballers
Sportspeople from Manzanillo, Colima
Association football forwards
Mexican expatriate footballers
C.D. Guadalajara footballers
Venados F.C. players
Tampico Madero F.C. footballers
Loros UdeC footballers
Tuxtla F.C. footballers
Coras de Nayarit F.C. footballers
Aiginiakos F.C. players
Real Estelí F.C. players
Liga MX players
Ascenso MX players
Football League (Greece) players
Mexican expatriate sportspeople in Nicaragua
Mexican expatriate sportspeople in El Salvador
Expatriate footballers in Greece
Expatriate footballers in Nicaragua
Expatriate footballers in El Salvador